Subic Seaplane, Inc. is a non-schedule charter airline based in Subic Bay in the Philippines. It provides business, surveying, sightseeing, and emergency services.

Destinations
Subic Seaplane offers charter flights to the following destinations : 
Boracay, Mount Pinatubo, Pandan Island, Puerto Galera, Manila, and Sangat Island

Fleet
 1 Aerospatiale AS350B2 (Airbus Helicopters H125/AS350)
 1 Eurocopter AS365 Dauphin (Airbus Helicopters AS365)
 1 Eurocopter EC145 (Airbus Helicopters H145)
 1 Learjet 35A (Learjet 35/36)

External links
Subic Seaplane

Airlines of the Philippines
Companies based in Olongapo
Seaplane operators